Dong Ha (born Kim Hyung-kyu; January 14, 1992) is a South Korean actor. He is best known for his roles in the television series Good Manager (2017), Suspicious Partner (2017), Judge vs. Judge (2017–2018), and Homemade Love Story (2020–2021).

Personal life

Military service
Dong began his mandatory military service on May 1, 2018, at the 5th Infantry Division Recruit Training Center in Yeoncheon County, Gyeonggi Province. He underwent five weeks of basic training before serving as an active duty soldier. He was officially discharged on December 27, 2019.

Filmography

Film

Television

Theater

Awards and nominations

References

External links
 
 

1992 births
Living people
Daekyeung University alumni
South Korean male film actors
South Korean male television actors
21st-century South Korean male actors